The 50th United States Colored Infantry Regiment was a U.S.C.T. infantry regiment in the Union Army during the American Civil War. It was organized from the 12th Louisiana Infantry (African Descent) in March 1864. It served in various posts in the Department of the Gulf and fought in the Battle of Fort Blakely in April 1865. It was mustered out on March 20, 1866.

See also
List of United States Colored Troops Civil War units

Sources
An Abbreviated History of the 50th United States Colored Troops Infantry Regiment

United States Colored Troops Civil War units and formations
Military units and formations established in 1864
1864 establishments in Louisiana
Military units and formations disestablished in 1866